Gerardo Reyes (born May 13, 1993) is a Mexican professional baseball pitcher in the Los Angeles Angels organization. He has previously played in MLB for the San Diego Padres.

Career
Reyes attended Hidalgo High School in Hidalgo, Texas. He attended Galveston College in Galveston, Texas. He appeared in four games his freshman season of 2013, but missed his sophomore season due to injury.

Tampa Bay Rays
Reyes signed as an un-drafted free agent out of a tryout camp by the Tampa Bay Rays in 2014. He made his professional debut with the Hudson Valley Renegades of the Class A Short Season New York-Penn League, pitching to a 2–1 win–loss record with a 4.09 earned run average (ERA) in 33 innings pitched.

San Diego Padres
In December 2014, Reyes was traded to the San Diego Padres in a three team trade between Tampa Bay, San Diego and the Washington Nationals that included Wil Myers, Trea Turner, and Steven Souza among the eleven players traded. After missing the 2015 season, he split the 2016 season between the Fort Wayne TinCaps of the Class A Midwest League and the Lake Elsinore Storm of the Class A-Advanced California League, accumulating a 4–5 with a 3.59 ERA in  innings. He spent 2017 back with Lake Elsinore, going 3–3 with a 2.63 ERA in  innings. He split the 2018 season between Lake Elsinore and the San Antonio Missions of the Double-A Texas League, accumulating a 1–3 with a 2.77 ERA in 55 innings.

The Padres added him to their 40-man roster after the 2018 season. He opened the 2019 season with the El Paso Chihuahuas of the Triple-A Pacific Coast League, going 4–2 with a 3.57 ERA over  innings. On April 12, 2019, he was promoted to the major leagues for the first time. He made his debut that night, pitching  innings in relief and earning the win. With the Padres in 2019, Reyes went 4–0 with a 7.62 ERA and 38 strikeouts over 26 innings.

Los Angeles Angels
On August 30, 2020, Reyes was traded to the Los Angeles Angels for Jason Castro. On March 5, 2021, Reyes was outrighted off of the 40-man roster. After suffering a sprain of the ulnar collateral ligament of the elbow, on March 11, 2021, it was announced that Reyes would undergo Tommy John surgery and miss the 2021 season as a result. He elected free agency on November 10, 2022. He re-signed a minor league deal on December 31, 2022.

References

External links

1993 births
Living people
Baseball players from Tamaulipas
El Paso Chihuahuas players
Fort Wayne TinCaps players
Galveston Whitecaps baseball players
Hudson Valley Renegades players
Lake Elsinore Storm players
Los Angeles Angels players
Major League Baseball pitchers
Major League Baseball players from Mexico
Mexican expatriate baseball players in the United States
People from Ciudad Victoria
People from Hidalgo County, Texas
San Antonio Missions players
San Diego Padres players
Yaquis de Obregón players
2023 World Baseball Classic players